"Kissing You" is a song by R&B singer Keith Washington from his 1991 debut album Make Time for Love. It spent one week at number one on the U.S. Hot R&B/Hip-Hop Songs chart and peaked at number forty on the Billboard Hot 100. "Kissing You" won a Soul Train Music Award for Best R&B/Soul Single, Male.

Charts

See also
List of number-one R&B singles of 1991 (U.S.)

References

Songs about kissing
1991 debut singles
1991 songs
Songs written by Keith Washington
Contemporary R&B ballads
Soul ballads
1990s ballads